Jean-Baptiste Joseph Fourier (21 March 1768 – 16 May 1830) was a French mathematician and physicist born in Auxerre and best known for initiating the investigation of Fourier series, which eventually developed into Fourier analysis and harmonic analysis, and their applications to problems of heat transfer and vibrations. The Fourier transform and Fourier's law of conduction are also named in his honour. Fourier is also generally credited with the discovery of the greenhouse effect.

Biography
Fourier was born at Auxerre (now in the Yonne département of France), the son of a tailor. He was orphaned at the age of nine. Fourier was recommended to the Bishop of Auxerre and, through this introduction, he was educated by the Benedictine Order of the Convent of St. Mark. The commissions in the scientific corps of the army were reserved for those of good birth, and being thus ineligible, he accepted a military lectureship on mathematics. He took a prominent part in his own district in promoting the French Revolution, serving on the local Revolutionary Committee. He was imprisoned briefly during the Terror but, in 1795, was appointed to the École Normale and subsequently succeeded Joseph-Louis Lagrange at the École Polytechnique.

Fourier accompanied Napoleon Bonaparte on his Egyptian expedition in 1798, as scientific adviser, and was appointed secretary of the Institut d'Égypte. Cut off from France by the British fleet, he organized the workshops on which the French army had to rely for their munitions of war. He also contributed several mathematical papers to the Egyptian Institute (also called the Cairo Institute) which Napoleon founded at Cairo, with a view of weakening British influence in the East. After the British victories and the capitulation of the French under General Menou in 1801, Fourier returned to France.

In 1801, Napoleon appointed Fourier Prefect (Governor) of the Department of Isère in Grenoble, where he oversaw road construction and other projects. However, Fourier had previously returned home from the Napoleon expedition to Egypt to resume his academic post as professor at École Polytechnique when Napoleon decided otherwise in his remark

Hence being faithful to Napoleon, he took the office of Prefect. It was while at Grenoble that he began to experiment on the propagation of heat. He presented his paper On the Propagation of Heat in Solid Bodies to the Paris Institute on December 21, 1807. He also contributed to the monumental Description de l'Égypte.

In 1822, Fourier succeeded Jean Baptiste Joseph Delambre as Permanent Secretary of the French Academy of Sciences. In 1830, he was elected a foreign member of the Royal Swedish Academy of Sciences.

Fourier never married.

In 1830, his diminished health began to take its toll:

Shortly after this event, he died in his bed on 16 May 1830.

Fourier was buried in the Père Lachaise Cemetery in Paris, a tomb decorated with an Egyptian motif to reflect his position as secretary of the Cairo Institute, and his collation of Description de l'Égypte. His name is one of the 72 names inscribed on the Eiffel Tower.

A bronze statue was erected in Auxerre in 1849, but it was melted down for armaments during World War II. Joseph Fourier University in Grenoble is named after him.

The Analytic Theory of Heat
In 1822, Fourier published his work on heat flow in Théorie analytique de la chaleur (The Analytical Theory of Heat),  in which he based his reasoning on Newton's law of cooling, namely, that the flow of heat between two adjacent molecules is proportional to the extremely small difference of their temperatures. This book was translated, with editorial 'corrections', into English 56 years later by Freeman (1878). The book was also edited, with many editorial corrections, by Darboux and republished in French in 1888.

There were three important contributions in this work, one purely mathematical, two essentially physical. In mathematics, Fourier claimed that any function of a variable, whether continuous or discontinuous, can be expanded in a series of sines of multiples of the variable. Though this result is not correct without additional conditions, Fourier's observation that some discontinuous functions are the sum of infinite series was a breakthrough. The question of determining when a Fourier series converges has been fundamental for centuries. Joseph-Louis Lagrange had given particular cases of this (false) theorem, and had implied that the method was general, but he had not pursued the subject. Peter Gustav Lejeune Dirichlet  was the first to give a satisfactory demonstration of it with some restrictive conditions. This work provides the foundation for what is today known as the Fourier transform.

One important physical contribution in the book was the concept of dimensional homogeneity in equations; i.e. an equation can be formally correct only if the dimensions match on either side of the equality; Fourier made important contributions to dimensional analysis. The other physical contribution was Fourier's proposal of his partial differential equation for conductive diffusion of heat. This equation is now taught to every student of mathematical physics.

Real roots of polynomials

Fourier left an unfinished work on determining and locating real roots of polynomials, which was edited by Claude-Louis Navier and published in 1831. This work contains much original matter—in particular, Fourier's theorem on polynomial real roots, published in 1820. François Budan, in 1807 and 1811, had published independently his theorem (also known by the name of Fourier), which is very close to Fourier's theorem (each theorem is a corollary of the other). Fourier's proof is the one that was usually given, during 19th century, in textbooks on the theory of equations. A complete solution of the problem was given in 1829 by Jacques Charles François Sturm.

Discovery of the greenhouse effect

In the 1820s, Fourier calculated that an object the size of the Earth, and at its distance from the Sun, should be considerably colder than the planet actually is if warmed by only  the effects of incoming solar radiation. He examined various possible sources of the additional observed heat in articles published in 1824 and 1827. However, in the end, because of the large 33-degree difference between his calculations and observations, Fourier mistakenly believed that there is a significant contribution of radiation from interstellar space. Still, Fourier's consideration of the possibility that the Earth's atmosphere might act as an insulator of some kind is widely recognized as the first proposal of what is now known as the greenhouse effect, although Fourier never called it that.

In his articles, Fourier referred to an experiment by de Saussure, who lined a vase with blackened cork. Into the cork, he inserted several panes of transparent glass, separated by intervals of air. Midday sunlight was allowed to enter at the top of the vase through the glass panes. The temperature became more elevated in the more interior compartments of this device. Fourier concluded that gases in the atmosphere could form a stable barrier like the glass panes. This conclusion may have contributed to the later use of the metaphor of the "greenhouse effect" to refer to the processes that determine atmospheric temperatures. Fourier noted that the actual mechanisms that determine the temperatures of the atmosphere included convection, which was not present in de Saussure's experimental device.

Works

 

 Translation by W M Connolley

See also
 Fourier analysis
 Fourier–Deligne transform
 Heat equation
 Least-squares spectral analysis
 List of things named after Joseph Fourier

References

Further reading

Initial text from the public domain Rouse History of Mathematics
 Fourier, Joseph. (1822). Theorie Analytique de la Chaleur. Firmin Didot (reissued by Cambridge University Press, 2009)
 Fourier, Joseph. (1878). The Analytical Theory of Heat. Cambridge University Press (reissued by Cambridge University Press, 2009)
 Fourier, J.-B.-J. (1824). Mémoires de l'Académie Royale des Sciences de l'Institut de France VII. 570–604 (Mémoire sur Les Temperatures du Globe Terrestre et Des Espaces Planetaires – greenhouse effect essay published in 1827)
 Fourier, J. Éloge historique de Sir William Herschel, prononcé dans la séance publique de l'Académie royale des sciences le 7 Juin, 1824. Historie de l'Académie Royale des Sciences de l'Institut de France, tome vi., année 1823, p. lxi.[Pg 227]

External links

 
 Fourier, J. B. J., 1824, Remarques Générales Sur Les Températures Du Globe Terrestre Et Des Espaces Planétaires., in Annales de Chimie et de Physique, Vol. 27, pp. 136–167 – translation by Burgess (1837).
 Université Joseph Fourier, Grenoble, France
Joseph Fourier and the Vuvuzela on MathsBank.co.uk
 
 Joseph Fourier – Œuvres complètes, tome 2 Gallican-Math
 

 
1768 births
1830 deaths
18th-century French mathematicians
19th-century French mathematicians
Barons of the First French Empire
Burials at Père Lachaise Cemetery
Commission des Sciences et des Arts members
Fluid dynamicists
Foreign Members of the Royal Society
French physicists
Honorary members of the Saint Petersburg Academy of Sciences
Mathematical analysts
Members of the Académie Française
Members of the French Academy of Sciences
Members of the Royal Swedish Academy of Sciences
Officers of the French Academy of Sciences
People from Auxerre
Prefects of Isère
French Roman Catholics